Émile Martel may refer to:

 Émile Martel (gymnast) (born 1898), French gymnast
 Émile Martel (writer) (born 1941), Canadian diplomat and writer